Crippled Intellect Productions (C.I.P.) is a record label for experimental music based in Chicago, Illinois, and run by the sound artist Blake Edwards. Edwards performs and records under the name Vertonen, and is a member of Anatomy of Habit, Startless, Burrow, and sseepage. The label is known for discovering and supporting artists who are relatively unknown, or who are just starting in their careers. It also publishes work by the artists who inspired Edwards, such as Z'EV, The Hafler Trio, and Crawl Unit.

Incremental Press
C.I.P. began in 1988 as a chapbook press in order to self-publish art and poetry by Blake Edwards. Seven chapbook titles were produced between 1988 and 1991. Editions were kept very small, and never went above 40. In December 1996, The publication side of C.I.P. was revived as Incremental Press (with crippled intellect press as an imprint) with the purchase of an ISBN number and the publication of loquedeeshes, by Sherman Johnson.

Early Releases
In the Fall of 1992, C.I.P. began publishing 7" records by Blake Edwards' solo project, Vertonen. The first releases still had ties to poetry, with spoken words and small booklets of text inserted into the sleeves.

CD publishing
In 1998, C.I.P. published its first CDs, taking a major step away from the label's initial self-publishing focus. Marked by a high production quality and professional look, C.I.P. reissued on CD a rare cassette by uns, an alter ego of the percussionist Z'EV, with an accompanying booklet containing extensive liner notes by the artist. This was followed by a CD titled "Everyone Gets What They Deserve" by Crawl Unit, as the sound artist Joe Colley was then known. With the label now firmly established, C.I.P. began taking risks by producing new titles by artists from deep underground, including a musique concrete group from Connecticut called Brutum Fulmen, Nuisance Beacon, and a long-lived yet under-documented artist from San Francisco, Skozey Fetisch.

The label did continue to publish work by Edwards, who received grants from the City of Chicago Arts Council. These albums including Edwards' strongest work to date: Return of the Interrobang (a title which suggests his interest in language); the drone album Orchid Collider (with cover art by Jason Talbot); and a live album called Stations.

Partial discography
Vertonen	Lock Up! 1-15 / Seizure	(7")
Vertonen	Strip Mining / Camche	(7")
R/B	Two Nights	(7", Ltd, Cle)
Vertonen	The Women Men Leave Their Wives For	(7")
Vertonen	Heat	(7")
Z'EV	An uns Momento	(CD)
Autonext	Volume One	(7", Ltd)
Crawl Unit / Vertonen	Soundtracks For Locations	(7")
Crawl Unit	Everyone Gets What They Deserve	(CD)
Nuisance Beacon	Nuisance Beacon	(CD)
v/a Bhreus Kormo	(CD)
Joe Colley	ANTHEM: Static For Empty Life	(CD, Mini)
Coeurl & Vertonen - Split Tour 7"
V.V. - Note	CD
The Brutum Fulmen - Flesh Of The Moon CD
Z'EV - Live 05.14.93 3"CD
Panicsville & Vertonen - Coagulation 7"
V.V. & Vertonen	V.V.V. 7"
Skozey Fetisch - Spectral Freight CD
Howard Stelzer & Jason Talbot - Four Sides	2x7"
Spider Compass Good Crime Band	- Carrion Luggage Organ 7"
Leticia Castaneda	On The Verge Of Redundance CD
Vertonen - Return Of The Interrobang CD
Z'EV	- N.A.M.E. Gallery, Chicago, Illinois 03.01.86	10"
Nautical Almanac & Vertonen - Split LP
Wolf Eyes - Lost Sockets 10"
Alu - 	Autismenschen CD
Jason Talbot	- A Love So Bright It Shines A Hole Through My Heart CD
Vertonen - Orchid Collider CD
Hans Grüsel's Krankenkabinet - Happy As Pitch CD
The Hafler Trio - If Take, Then Take: Tricks, Half-Tricks & Real Phenomena LP
Joe Colley - No (Intermittent Positive Negation In Two Syllables) 7"
PCRV - Big Sky CD
K.K. Null & Z'EV	- Artificial Life CD
Vertonen - Stations CD
Goat / SIXES / Xome	- Deluxe Incinerator 3x3"CD
Michael Gendreau & Francisco López - Drowning / Untitled #185	LP
Bran(...)Pos	- COIN-OP KHEPRI CD
Vertonen & Demons - Grew Up In A Drought / Live Enemy LP
Illusion Of Safety - Sedation & Quell 10"
Jason Zeh - Heraclitus CD

References
Official Site

American record labels
Record labels established in 1988